Decatur Public Schools District 61 is a public unit school district in Macon County, Illinois.   it was the 26th largest school district in Illinois, and had one pre-kindergarten/early learning center, four full K-8 schools, eleven elementary schools with kindergarten through sixth grade, two middle schools, two high schools, and two alternative education programs.

One of the grade schools is a Montessori school.  High schools include Eisenhower High School and MacArthur High School.  An older high school, Stephen Decatur High School, closed in 2000.

As of 2022 the District has 5 elementary schools, 1 middle school, 2 high schools, and 7 specialty schools.

History
The earliest record of schooling in Decatur, Illinois, is of school being held in a room on South Main Street in 1830; afterwards it was held in the log courthouse in 1831 and 1832.  Decatur's first purpose-built schoolhouse was a two-story building at Water and North Park streets, built in the 1840s by the Freemasons, with a classroom on the first floor and the Mason lodge room on the second floor.

Schools were private at the time, but a state law in 1849 allowed, by public vote, a real estate tax to support schools; Decatur citizens passed the tax in 1851 to repair the "brick school house", presumably the one built by the Masons.

In Illinois, the general school law on February 15, 1855, provided for taxes across the state to educate all children in the state, and required that each district maintain school for at least 6 months each year.  Under the new law that year, the first school district in Decatur was formed, and the first building exclusively for school purposes, the "Big Brick", was built
at the northwest corner of Church and North streets, and opened in 1857.  However, the general school law was believed to be unsuitable for a city school system, and the modern Decatur school district was established by a special charter of the Illinois General Assembly approved on February 16, 1865.

High school was first held on September 22, 1862, in the east room of the Big Brick, and later in the basement of the Baptist church.  The first high school commencement was on June 20, 1867, at Powers Hall, with four girls graduating.  The first purpose-built high school building was opened in September 1869 at North and Broadway streets.

Schools

High schools 
Eisenhower High School
MacArthur High School
 William Harris Learning Academy

Primary schools 
 American Dreamer STEM Academy
 Baum Elementary School
 Dennis Lab School
 Franklin Grove Elementary School
 Hope Academy
 Johns Hill Magnet School
 Montessori Academy for Peace
 Muffley Elementary School
 Parsons Elementary School
 Pershing Early Learning Center
 South Shores Elementary School
 Stephen Decatur Middle School
 William Harris Learning Academy

References

External links
 

School districts established in 1865
1865 establishments in Illinois
Decatur, Illinois
Education in Macon County, Illinois
School districts in Illinois